Demographics of Washington may refer to:

 Demographics of Washington (state)
 Demographics of Washington, D.C.